Richard Burmeister (1860 in Hamburg, Germany – 1944) was a German-American composer and pianist active in the late 19th and early 20th centuries.

Biography
Burmeister studied with Franz Liszt (1881–84). He made concert tours through Europe in 1883-85, and from 1885 to 1897 was the head of the piano department of the Peabody Institute in Baltimore. From 1897 to 1899 he was director of the Scharwenka Conservatory of Music's New York City branch.

Burmeister was active in the musical scenes of Hamburg, Berlin, and Dresden. Along with fellow composers Joseph Pache, Asger Hamerik, Fritz Finke and Otto Sutro, Burmeister played a sizeable role in the 1890s musical culture of Baltimore.

Works
His compositions include a concerto in D minor for pianoforte and orchestra, a ballade for pianoforte, an arrangement for pianoforte and orchestra of Liszt's Concerto Pathétique for two pianofortes, “The Chase After Fortune” (described as a “symphonic fantasy”) for orchestra, and a reorchestration of Chopin's F-minor Piano Concerto.

References

External links
 

Musicians from Baltimore
German composers
Peabody Institute faculty
Musicians from Hamburg
1860 births
1944 deaths
German emigrants to the United States